Time's Makin' Changes – The Best of Tesla is the first greatest hits album for the rock band Tesla. It includes songs from their first four studio albums, Mechanical Resonance, The Great Radio Controversy, Psychotic Supper, and Bust a Nut, as well as their first live album, Five Man Acoustical Jam.

Track listing 
 "Modern Day Cowboy" – 5:18 (From Mechanical Resonance)
 "Gettin' Better" – 3:20 (From Mechanical Resonance)
 "Little Suzi" – 4:02 (From Mechanical Resonance)
 "Heaven's Trail (No Way Out)" – 4:33 (From The Great Radio Controversy)
 "The Way It Is" – 5:09 (From The Great Radio Controversy)
 "Love Song" – 5:21 (From The Great Radio Controversy)
 "Signs" – 3:14 (Live) (From Five Man Acoustical Jam)
 "Paradise" – 5:09 (Live) (From Five Man Acoustical Jam)
 "Edison's Medicine" – 4:48 (From Psychotic Supper)
 "Song & Emotion" – 5:55 (From Psychotic Supper)
 "What You Give" – 7:18 (From Psychotic Supper)
 "Mama's Fool" – 6:11 (From Bust a Nut)
 "A lot to Lose" – 5:11 (From Bust a Nut)
 "Steppin' Over" (Hannon, Keith, Luccketta, Wheat) – 4:22 (Previously unreleased)
 "Changes" – 5:03 (From Mechanical Resonance)

Charts

Album

Singles

Certifications

References

1995 greatest hits albums
Geffen Records compilation albums
Tesla (band) compilation albums